Andrzej Jan Gołota (born 5 January 1968), best known as Andrew Golota, is a Polish former professional boxer who competed from 1992 to 2013. He challenged four times for a heavyweight world title (by all four major sanctioning bodies), and as an amateur won a bronze medal in the heavyweight division at the 1988 Olympics. Despite his accomplishments and more than 40 professional wins, Golota is perhaps best known for twice being disqualified against Riddick Bowe for repeated low blows in fights that Golota was winning. On October 4, 1997, he became the first Pole to challenge for a heavyweight boxing crown when he fought WBC champion Lennox Lewis at Boardwalk Hall in Atlantic City. In November 2016, Golota was inducted into the Illinois Boxing Hall of Fame.

Amateur career
The Warsaw-born, Golota had 111 wins and 10 losses in an amateur career that culminated in his winning a bronze medal at the 1988 Summer Olympics. Golota won other international amateur tournaments as well.

In 1990, he got into a fight with a machinist "about half a foot and 50 pounds smaller" in a bar in Poland. Facing charges of assault and battery, he fled rather than risk five years in prison.  Later that year, he married an American citizen of Polish descent and settled in Chicago.
Gołota's Olympic results were as follows:
1st round bye
Defeated Svilen Rusinov (Bulgaria) 5-0
Defeated Harold Obunga (Kenya) 5-0
Lost to Baik Hyun-Man (South Korea) RSC 2

Professional career
In 1992, Golota turned professional, knocking out Roosevelt Shuler in three rounds. He had three more knockouts and then went the distance for the first time, defeating Robert Smith in six rounds. He won his next 16 fights by knockout. His wins included Bobby Crabtree and Jeff Lampkin. Following his KO of Crabtree he was featured in Ring Magazine's new faces section. Soon after, he faced a respected contender, Maron Wilson. Golota won a ten-round decision. He won his next five bouts by knockout. His opponents included Samson Po'uha and Darnell Nicholson, both of whom were considered fringe contenders at the time. The win over Po'uha was memorable for the moment in which Gołota bit Po'uha on the side of the neck, two years before the bite-including rematch between Evander Holyfield and Mike Tyson.

Golota vs. Bowe I & II

Golota's first high-profile fight came against former heavyweight champion Riddick Bowe. Bowe had not fought in nearly a year since his third and final fight with Evander Holyfield, which he won by technical knockout in the eighth round, and had said regarding his opponent, "how do you train for a bum?", paying no attention to his opponent's win–loss record. The fight was held at Madison Square Garden on 11 July 1996, and was televised by HBO as part of its World Championship Boxing series.

Early in the fight it appeared that Bowe had underestimated his opponent's skills. However, Golota's penchant for not following the rules was also showcased in this fight as he took to striking Bowe in the testes. After being repeatedly warned, referee Wayne Kelly began deducting points from Golota and had done so twice prior to the seventh round. Early in that round, Kelly took a third point from Golota for punching Bowe in the testes, and warned him that if he did it again, he was going to lose the fight. Golota continued to fight and with less than a minute left in the round landed several hard shots that appeared to have Bowe staggered. However, with 37 seconds remaining in the round Golota dropped Bowe with another punch directly to the testes, and Kelly disqualified him. What ensued was a dramatic riot that left a large number of civilians and policemen injured, including Gołota himself, who was hit by a member of Bowe's entourage with a two-way radio and required eleven stitches to close a cut on his head. The riot, which has been named "Riot at the Garden", was called Event of the Year by Ring Magazine.

The controversy of Golota vs. Bowe I created interest in a rematch, which was held in Atlantic City, New Jersey on December 14, 1996. Golota vs. Bowe II was on Pay Per View and Gołota once again led Bowe on the scorecards only to be disqualified in the ninth round by referee Eddie Cotton, again for multiple shots to Bowe's testes. This fight also proved to be controversial, and a protest was filed by Gołota's camp to try to overturn the fight's result. Michael Katz, a sportswriter, coined the term Foul Pole for Gołota. Both fights are featured on HBO's documentary Legendary Nights The Tale of Bowe Golota.

Championship fight with Lewis

Despite two losses in a row, Gołota became the WBC number one contender. On 4 October 1997, he received a shot at the world's Heavyweight championship against Lennox Lewis in Atlantic City, New Jersey. Gołota was knocked out in the first round.

Gołota subsequently claimed that an injection of lidocaine for tendonitis in his right knee given to him by his physician shortly before the fight made him woozy and impaired his vision. The adverse effects of lidocaine include dizziness, blurred vision, seizures. As a result, he filed a medical malpractice suit against his physician, claiming that the injection had cost him the fight and a deal with HBO for $21 million to broadcast his next four to five fights.

Later career

Gołota's boxing career continued with his beating former 2-time world champion Tim Witherspoon by decision. In his next match, he lost to Michael Grant by a knockout in the tenth round in one of The Ring'''s 1999 fights of the year. Gołota scored two knockdowns of Grant in the first round. He was ahead on all three judges' scorecards in the tenth round when he himself was knocked down. When asked by referee Randy Neuman whether he wanted to continue, he shook his head twice and then haltingly answered "No".

In 2000, Gołota fought in China beating Marcus Rhodes with a third-round knockout. Later in 2000, he faced former heavyweight champion Mike Tyson. Tyson knocked Golota down in the first round, and in between rounds Golota told his corner to stop the fight but his corner talked him into continuing. In the third round, as he had done in the Grant match, Gołota told the referee he did not want to continue, despite his team desperately urging him on. He later claimed a headbutt impaired him during the fight, which was one of his main reasons for deciding not to continue. The result of the fight was later changed to no contest when Tyson failed a post fight drug test, testing positive for marijuana. Following the Tyson fight, Gołota was inactive for nearly three years before returning to the ring on 14 August 2003. He scored a technical knockout of journeyman Brian Nix in the seventh round. On November 15, Golota knocked out Terrence Lewis in the sixth round at Verona, New York. Gołota then received a second world title shot, fighting IBF heavyweight champion Chris Byrd at New York City's Madison Square Garden on 17 April 2004. The fight resulted in a draw.

On 13 November 2004, Gołota received his second world title shot in a row. Despite knocking down WBA champion John Ruiz twice within the bout, he lost by unanimous decision.

Golota received his third world title try in a row on 21 May 2005 against WBO champion Lamon Brewster. Though heavily favored to win, Gołota lost when Brewster knocked him down three times inside the first round, prompting the referee to stop the bout. On 9 June 2007, he beat Jeremy Bates in the 2nd round by technical knockout. Gołota fought Kevin McBride on October 6, 2007 in Madison Square Garden and won by TKO in the 6th round, winning the inaugural IBF North American Heavyweight championship.

On 19 January 2008, Gołota defeated Mike Mollo by unanimous decision in 12 rounds to win the World Boxing Association Fedelatin heavyweight championship belt. In January, 2009, Gołota lost by first-round TKO to Ray Austin. On 24 October 2009 in Łódź, Gołota fought Tomasz Adamek and lost by TKO in the 5th round. The event was hosted on Polsat TV, it was also broadcast live online on ipla.tv platform. It was the largest live internet transmission in Poland. 

Professional boxing record

Television viewership

Poland

Pay-per-view bouts

United States

Pay-per-view bouts

Other
Golota took part in Census 2010 commercials, recorded in Polish and English. In 2010, he appeared in the Polish edition of Dancing with the Stars (Taniec z Gwiazdami) with partner Magdalena Soszyńska-Michno. In his first appearance he danced waltz. He fell out on 7 November 2010, in 1/8 final. He reached 5th place. 
He has also participated in Polish version of The Mole'' (Agent - Gwiazdy), he has been eliminated and came on eight place.

References

External links

1968 births
Living people
Polish emigrants to the United States
Olympic boxers of Poland
Heavyweight boxers
Boxers at the 1988 Summer Olympics
Boxers from Warsaw
Olympic medalists in boxing
Polish male boxers
Medalists at the 1988 Summer Olympics
Olympic bronze medalists for Poland